Thamala is an Indomalayan genus of butterflies in the family Lycaenidae.

Species
Thamala marciana (Hewitson, 1863)
Thamala moultoni Corbet, 1942 Borneo

References

Loxurini
Lycaenidae genera
Taxa named by Frederic Moore